Kilsyth Wanderers Football Club was a Scottish association football club based in the town of Kilsyth, North Lanarkshire. The club was founded in 1887 and disbanded in 1902. The club competed in the Scottish Cup for five seasons between 1887 and 1899 as well as regional competitions such as the Stirlingshire Cup, Midland League, and the Central Football Combination. From 1888 onwards, the club's home colours were black and white vertical striped shirts with navy blue shorts.

References 

Defunct football clubs in Scotland
Association football clubs established in 1887
1887 establishments in Scotland
Association football clubs disestablished in 1902
1902 disestablishments in Scotland
Kilsyth